The American smooth flounder (Pleuronectes putnami) is a flatfish of the family Pleuronectidae. Its native habitat is the temperate waters of the northwestern Atlantic, from Ungava Bay in Quebec, Canada to Rhode Island, United States.

Description
The American smooth flounder is a right-eyed flatfish, resembling the winter flounder in shape and appearance. Its upper side, including the fins, ranges in colour from dark grey to brown or almost black, and may be either uniform or mottled with darker patches of the same colour; its underside is white. Females are smooth on both sides of the body, whilst males are rough on the upper side.

Range and habitat
The American smooth flounder inhabits the shallow salt and brackish arctic-boreal waters of the northwestern Atlantic, living inshore on the soft mud bottoms of estuaries, river mouths and sheltered bays. Its range stretches along the Canada–US coast from Quebec through Newfoundland and Labrador, Nova Scotia, Prince Edward Island, Maine, New Hampshire and Massachusetts to Rhode Island.

Diet

The diet of the American smooth flounder consists mainly of zoobenthos invertebrates such as crustaceans, molluscs and marine worms.

References

American smooth flounder
Fish of the Atlantic Ocean
Fauna of Atlantic Canada
Fauna of the Northeastern United States
American smooth flounder